Jordi Galí (born January 4, 1961) is a Spanish macroeconomist who is regarded as one of the main figures in New Keynesian macroeconomics today. He is currently the director of the Centre de Recerca en Economia Internacional (CREI, the Center for Research in International Economics) at Universitat Pompeu Fabra and a Research Professor at the Barcelona Graduate School of Economics. After obtaining his doctorate from MIT in 1989 under the supervision of Olivier Blanchard, he held faculty positions at Columbia University and New York University before moving to Barcelona.

Research contributions 
Galí's research centers on the causes of business cycles and on optimal monetary policy, especially through the lens of time series analysis.  His studies with Richard Clarida and Mark Gertler suggest that monetary policy in many countries today resembles the Taylor rule, whereas the policy makers of the 1970s failed to follow the Taylor rule.

Another theme of Galí's research is how central banks should set interest rates. In some of the simplest New Keynesian macroeconomic models, stabilizing the inflation rate stabilizes the output gap too. If this property were roughly true in reality, it would permit central bankers to pursue a simplified Taylor rule focused only on inflation stabilization, with no need to consider output growth. Jordi Galí and Olivier Blanchard have called this property the 'divine coincidence', and have argued that in more realistic models which include additional frictions, it no longer holds. Instead, models with additional frictions (such as frictional unemployment) imply a tradeoff between stabilizing inflation and stabilizing the output gap.

Galí is perhaps best known for providing time series evidence that improvements in labour productivity cause employment to decrease.  This finding contradicts the predictions of some well-known real business cycle models promoted by the New Classical macroeconomic school, but is (according to Galí) consistent with many New Keynesian models. However, the statistical methods ('structural vector autoregressions') on which this finding is based remain controversial.

Galí is the most cited author of Journal of Monetary Economics and European Economic Review.

Books 
In 2008, Princeton University Press published Galí's monograph Monetary Policy, Inflation, and the Business Cycle. The book provides an introduction to New Keynesian DSGE models, and analyzes the implications of those models for monetary policy. It is written at a level intended for introductory graduate courses in macroeconomics. A second edition was published in 2015.

Awards 
In 2005, Galí received the Yrjö Jahnsson Award of the European Economic Association, of which he is also a fellow, in recognition of his work on New Keynesian macroeconomics. He shared the prize with Timothy Besley of the London School of Economics. Thomson Reuters lists him among the 'citation laureates' who are likely future winners of the Nobel Prize in Economics.

See also 
 Barcelona Graduate School of Economics

References

External links 
 Galí's website at the 
 Jordi Galí's Barcelona GSE faculty profile
 Barcelona GSE Research Professors

1961 births
Living people
New Keynesian economists
Macroeconomists
Economists from Catalonia
20th-century  Spanish economists
21st-century  Spanish  economists
Academic staff of Pompeu Fabra University
Academic staff of the Barcelona Graduate School of Economics
Fellows of the Econometric Society
Fellows of the European Economic Association